Mirri may refer to:

 Mirri Kalan, a village in Unnao district, Uttar Pradesh, India
 Mirri Khurd, a village in Unnao district, Uttar Pradesh, India
 Mirri Lobo (born 1960), Cape Verdean musical artist
 Roberto Mirri (born 1978), Italian footballer

See also
 Mirrie Hill OBE (1889–1986), Australian composer